Kalyana Rekhe is a 1993 Indian Kannada-language film directed by M. S. Rajashekar and produced by M. Sadanand under the banner Yamini Pictures. The film stars Malashri and Shashikumar. The supporting cast features Shubha, K. S. Ashwath, Thoogudeepa Srinivas, Girija Lokesh, Tennis Krishna and Doddanna. Acclaimed director S. K. Bhagavan was also a part of star cast in supporting role. The film was based on the novel written by Sai Suthe

Cast 
 Malashri
 Shashikumar
 Thoogudeepa Srinivas
 Shubha
 Doddanna
 K. S. Ashwath
 Sundar Krishna Urs
 S. K. Bhagavan
 Girija Lokesh
 Ashalatha
 M. S. Umesh

Soundtrack

Hamsalekha composed the music for the film and wrote lyrics and the soundtracks. The album consists of six soundtracks.

References 

1993 films
1990s Kannada-language films
Films directed by M. S. Rajashekar
Films scored by Hamsalekha
Films based on Indian novels